Kimberley Chen Fang-yu (born 23 May 1994) is an Australian singer, actress and model based in Taiwan.
In 2009, she landed her first hit with the love ballad "愛你" (Aini, "Love You"). In 2012, she became a professional singer in Taiwan, singing in both English and Mandarin.

Chen briefly worked with the B.ANGEL production house in 2014 before signing with Hong Kong-based company Sharp Music, eventually appearing in the Chinese version of Produce 101 in 2018. She was appointed A+, the highest ranking in the show, and received over 4.3 billion views for each of her performances. In 2019, Chen left Sharp Music due to Sharp Music's breach of contract. She dropped all charges in hope for peace but they continued to defame her using the media. She then filed for defamation and they were forced to stop harassing her. According to sources they unrightfully took a lot of her money.

In 2020, she signed to Chynahouse, belonging to Kkbox, the first streaming platform and largest digital conglomerate in Taiwan.

Chen has been banned in Mainland China as a result of the song and music video "Fragile" a collaboration with Malaysian-Chinese hip hop artist Namewee which went viral in October 2021.

Early and personal life 
Chen grew up in Melbourne as the daughter of Malaysian migrants. She attended Tintern Grammar and the Victorian College of the Arts.

Chen began her singing career at the age of four, first coached by her father. She performed regularly at charity concerts and clubs. Later, she was trained by Vladimir Vasilev, the conductor and musical director of the Russian Bolshoi Ballet for over 5 years.  She learnt Ballet, Pointe, Tap, Jazz, Contemporary, HipHop, Locking, Popping, acrobatics and acting. She was offered 3 scholarships by the age of 10 but had to turn them down due to her other work. She was the only child model on Nine Network's The Price Is Right. In 2005 and 2006, she appeared as Young Nala in the Broadway production of Disney's The Lion King in Melbourne and Shanghai.

From a young age, Chen was active on media and appeared in a McDonald's commercial that aired throughout Asia.

During the East Timor Crisis, she donated to Caritas Australia to directly aid East Timor. At the age of 8, she sang and danced a rendition of Jennifer Lopez's song, Let's Get Loud, with back-up dancers on the Royal Children's Hospital's 2003 Good Friday Appeal fundraiser on the Seven Network.

Discovered by Grundy Television executive director Michael Whyte, Chen was offered an ongoing role as the featured child model on The Price Is Right for its 2003 revival. She performed in over 400 episodes on the Nine Network over 2 years.

Later in 2005, Chen was selected by JYP Entertainment in New York City as a trainee to debut in America. Yolanda Wyns trained her in singing, dancing, and acting. She left JYP Entertainment in 2009 when the company decided to close down their U.S operations. She was offered to become a trainee in South Korea instead but since her parents didn't have any plans to relocate to South Korea she turned down the offer. Chen recorded with Grammy-award winners Gordon Chambers and Barry Eastmond. She was also trained by  Jermaine Browne and 
Jazzy J
In March 2007, Chen was selected to sing the national anthem at the Australian Football League NAB Cup Grand Final.

Chen's whole family relocated to Taiwan in 2009 to pursue her professional singing career. When arriving, she had little command of Mandarin. She studied the language intensively, which was key to her ability to succeed in the Asian music market. In March 2010, she was invited to compete in the Taiwanese televised singing competition One Million Star. She was then asked to be the guest singer for Kelly Clarkson's All I Ever Wanted World Tour in Taipei. Chen has released five studio albums and is currently signed to Chynahouse.

In 2022, she came out that she is pansexual.

Music career

2012: Debut with Kimberley 
After nearly 3 years of preparation, Chen's debut album was released on 27 April 2012, featuring 6 Mandarin songs and 5 English songs. Two of her songs were featured on the Taiwanese series Fondant Garden starring Park Jung-min. Her debut single "愛你 (Love You)" has been a success on YouTube, with over 106 million views and generally positive comments.

Chen's second single, "Never Change," co-written with Australian artist Don Bianco, was the first for which she contributed music and lyrics. Chen has released music videos of her two singles: 愛你 (Love You), also starring JPM, and "廖允傑" (LilJay). They have been a success on YouTube, gaining over 15 million views. In Taiwan, she has come first in KKBOX charts with her debut album ezPeer, 台灣大哥大, 中華電信 and 遠傳電信, topping ringtone download charts.

2013: Kimbonomics 
Sony Music announced on 16 December 2013, that Chen would be releasing her second studio album, Kimbonomics. The album was released on 25 December 2013 and contained 10 tracks. It placed 4th on the weekly music charts of KKBOX in Taiwan on 25 January 2014.

2017–2018: #Tag Me and Produce 101 China 
In late 2017, Chen released her third studio album, #Tag Me. In 2018 she was one of the participants in Produce 101 and finished No. 26.

Discography 

 Kimberley (2012)
 Kimbonomics (2013)
 #Tag Me (2017)
 Princess Tendencies (2020)
 Up on the Roof (2022)

Filmography

Television

Music video appearances 
 2012 – "Internet", from Kimberley with JPM
 2021 – "玻璃心 Fragile", from 鬼才做音樂 Ghosician with Namewee 黃明志

Awards and nominations

2012 Metro Radio Mandarin Hits Music Awards Presentation

Global Chinese Pop chart

2012 Metro Hit Awards

2012 Ultimate Song Chart Awards Presentation

2012 Top Ten Chinese Gold Songs Award Concert

Canadian Chinese Music Pop chart

KKBOX Music Awards

Global Chinese Golden Chart Awards

2013 HITO Music Awards

Neway Karaoke Songs chart

2015 Music King Awards

References 

1994 births
Living people
Australian child actresses
Australian women singers
Australian people of Malaysian descent
Victorian College of the Arts alumni
Australian people of Chinese descent
Australian musical theatre actresses
Australian expatriates in Taiwan
Actresses from Melbourne
Singers from Melbourne
One Million Star contestants
Produce 101 (Chinese TV series) contestants
Australian actresses of Asian descent